Mohsen Alijani-Zamani is an Iranian physician and reformist politician who is currently a member of the Parliament of Iran representing Tehran, Rey, Shemiranat and Eslamshahr electoral district.

Career

Electoral history

References

Iranian activists
Association of Combatant Clerics politicians
Living people
Members of the 10th Islamic Consultative Assembly
Volunteer Basij personnel of the Iran–Iraq War
Year of birth missing (living people)